The Western Michigan Broncos baseball team is a varsity intercollegiate athletic team of Western Michigan University in Kalamazoo, Michigan, United States. The team competes in the National Collegiate Athletic Association (NCAA) at the Division I as a member of the Mid-American Conference West division. The team plays its home games at Hyames Field in Kalamazoo. The Broncos are coached by Billy Gernon, who began his tenure in 2011.

Western Michigan's first baseball team was fielded in 1911. Through the 2016 season, the Broncos have won 14 MAC titles, the most recent being in 1989, and have made 11 appearances in the NCAA Division I Baseball Championship, with the most recent being in 2016 following their first Mid-American Conference baseball tournament championship. Western Michigan has also made six appearances in the College World Series, the most recent being in 1963. The 1955 team finished as national runner-up, falling to Wake Forest 7–6 in the championship game. The Broncos had a 6–3 lead in the fifth inning of that game before the Demon Deacons tied it in the sixth inning and took the lead in the eighth. The runner-up finish remains tied for the highest national finish for a MAC team, along with Eastern Michigan in 1976.

Broncos in Major League Baseball
Since the Major League Baseball Draft began in 1965, Western Michigan has had 97 players selected.

See also
List of NCAA Division I baseball programs

References

External links
 

 
Baseball teams established in 1911
1911 establishments in Michigan